The Cardiff Film Festival (Gŵyl Ffilm Caerdydd in Welsh) was an annual film festival that took place in Cardiff, Wales. It had previously been called the Cardiff Screen Festival.

Background 
Commencing in 1989, it was originally held annually in Aberystwyth as the National film festival for Wales, before being moved to Cardiff due to popularity. The festival offered the chance to meet the directors of many of the films in a more approachable fashion, as the customers and the movie-makers could mingle in a relaxed atmosphere.

The 2005 film festival was held from November 9 to November 19, and was based in Chapter Arts Centre, with extra films being shown in a nearby Cineworld cinema complex. As well as offering films, 2005 saw the festival offer workshops and question and answer sessions with film directors and film producers, as well as talks about how to get into the movie business.

The 2006 festival took place between the 8th and 18 November and would be the last.

The Film Agency for Wales subsequently decided that the festival would be replaced by a new International Film Event for Wales.

Past winners

2006
Audience Award: Are You Ready for Love?
International Winner: Shut Up and Shoot Me
Best Welsh Short: The Outsider
Best International Short: En Attendant

2005
Audience Award: Dead Long Enough
International Winner: The Puffy Chair
DM Davies Award for short film: Dawn by Shreepali Patel from Cardiff

Notes

External links
Official homepage
Chapter Arts Centre
Film Agency of Wales

Film festivals in Wales
Festivals in Cardiff
Defunct film festivals in the United Kingdom